Uiduk University is a private university located in Kyungju, Gyeongsangbuk-do, South Korea. It is situated between Pohang and Kyungju near the village of Gangdong-myeon. It has a Department of Buddhist Cultural Studies, Language Division (English, Japanese Language & Culture, Chinese), Division of Public Administration(Police Administration, Cyber Police & Security, Fire & Disaster Prevention), Division of Self-designed major, Department of Early Childhood Education, Division of Special Education(Elementary Special Education, Secondary Special Education) Department of Social Welfare, Department of Health, Department of Nursing, Department of Physical Therapy, Department of Business Management, Department of Airlines and Tourism, Division of Food Service Industry(Culinary Arts for Hotel & Restaurant, Professional Baking & Pastry Techniques, Food & Nutrition), Division of Physical Education (Sports and Leisure, Physical Dance)  Division of Steel IT(Steel Convergence, Information Electronics, Software), Division of Mechanical and Electrical Engineering (Electrical Engineering, Nuclear Power Plant & Control System Engineering, Automotive Convergence, Division of Green Energy Engineering, Semiconductors & Electronics Engineering, New & Renewable Energy Engineering)

The university offers graduate programs leading to either an M.A. and or a PhD.

The university is owned and operated by the Jingkak Buddhist Order. It opened its doors to the first intake of students on March 3, 1996.

The university has opened up courses for foreign students to learn Korean, and then enroll in the regular courses. The existing foreign student programme has students from China, Vietnam and the Philippines. Many of these students are attracted to Korea, because of its standing in the electronics and the semiconductor industry. They come to learn Korean, and then join another technical department as a full-time student.

See also
List of colleges and universities in South Korea
Education in South Korea

References

External links
Official website 

Universities and colleges in Gyeongju
Buddhist universities and colleges in South Korea